Arbor Day is the second album by New Zealand Christian rock band The Lads, released in 1996.

Track listing 
All songs written by The Lads, except for "The Well is Deep" by Albert Osbourne.

Credits 
The Lads are:

 Paul Zimbuli Cotton
 Bennett Knowles
 Steve King
 Mark Millard
 Chris White
 Recorded at Vision Studios, Wellington, NZ
 Producer by - Phil Hornblow, The Lads
 Sound engineer - Phil Hornblow
 Additional programming - Phil Hornblow
 Guitar engineer - Gary Taylor
 Additional guitar overdubs - Gary Taylor
 Song arrangement oversight - Karel Van Helden-Stevens
 Backing vocals coordinator - Karel Van Helden-Stevens
 Brass arrangement on 'Song for Richard' - Lucy Mulgan

Additional musicians:

 Cello - Rachel Macann
 Violin, Viola - Caroline Dewson
 Oboe - Georgina Coffey
 Trumpet - Mathew Constabie
 Trombone - Owen Clarke
 Brass Quintet on 'Don't Look Away' - Wellington South Salvation Army Band: Stephen Stein, Graerne Howan, David Flu, Phil Neal, Ian Gainsford
 Lowland Pipes - Grant Shearer
 Percussion - Lance Philip
 Saxophone solo on 'Lift Him Up' - Anton Wuts
 Backing vocals - Karel Van Helden-Stevens, Phil Hornblow
 Photography - Andrew Bridge
 Front Cover model - Jo Jo
 Artwork, layout, typography, printing - Anthony Haigh

References

1996 albums
The Lads albums